The Derde Klasse is a women's football league in the Netherlands. Teams in this league promote to the Tweede Klasse and relegate to the Vierde Klasse.

The league is organized into Saturday and Sunday divisions. Each of these are further divided into eight groups, creating 16 sections.

Sections
Saturday
 Group A: West
 Group B: West
 Group C: South
 Group D: West
 Group E: East
 Group F: East
 Group G: East
 Group H: East

Sunday
 Group A: West
 Group B: West
 Group C: West
 Group D: South
 Group E: South
 Group F: South
 Group G: East
 Group H: East

References

Women's football leagues in the Netherlands